The Quirino Highway, formerly called the El Quirino Express Road or Ipo Road, is a four-to-eight lane, secondary highway that connects Quezon City to the municipality of Norzagaray in Bulacan, Philippines. The road is a designated as National Route 127 (N127) of the Philippine highway network within the city bounds of Quezon City, Radial Road 7 (R-7), and a spur of Radial Road 8 (R-8) of Metro Manila's arterial road network.

History
Prior to the construction of the Balintawak Interchange and North Diversion Road, it forms an old road that linked the city of Manila with Novaliches, previously called as the Manila-del Monte Garay Road, Manila-Novaliches Road, Bonifacio-Manila Road, Balintawak-Novaliches Road, and Highway 52. The portion of the road south of EDSA is presently known as A. Bonifacio Avenue. Circa 1955, the section of the highway from Novaliches to the Caloocan–San Jose del Monte boundary was called Novaliches-San Jose Road.

It was later changed to the Don Tomas Susano Road, after the first officially recognized political leader of the district and a former mayor of Caloocan, during the American Occupation of the Philippines. The name changed once more to Quirino Highway, right after the death of Philippine President Elpidio Quirino (1890-1956), who had lived at a nearby retreat house in Quezon City and died in the same residence.

Route description
Quirino Highway starts from Epifanio de los Santos Avenue, near the Balintawak Cloverleaf in Quezon City. It then runs shortly in parallel to North Luzon Expressway (NLEX) carrying one-way northbound traffic and turns northeast towards the northwestern part of Quezon City. It then meets the Old Novaliches and New Novaliches Flyovers, connecting it to NLEX. The highway turns right at the Novaliches proper, approaching the areas of Amparo and Tala in Caloocan, San Jose del Monte, and ends at the roundabout with Villarama Road and Ipo Road in Bigte, Norzagaray, Bulacan. Past the roundabout, it is continued by Ipo Road that leads to Ipo Dam.

The highway is also the alternate route for going to Baliwag and up to Cagayan Valley via Cagayan Valley Road.

Intersections

See also 
 Major roads in Metro Manila

References 

Roads in Metro Manila
Roads in Bulacan